Soybean plants (Glycine max) are subject to a variety of diseases and pests.

Bacterial diseases

Fungal diseases

Nematodes, parasitic

Viral diseases

See also 

 Soybean management practices

References

Common Names of Diseases, The American Phytopathological Society

Soybean
Pulse crop diseases
Soybean diseases